Yasny is a rural locality (a village) in Dmitriyevsky Selsoviet, Ufimsky District, Bashkortostan, Russia. The population was 51 as of 2010. There are 3 streets.

Geography 
Yasny is located 19 km northwest of Ufa (the district's administrative centre) by road. Dmitriyevka is the nearest rural locality.

References 

Rural localities in Ufimsky District